The arrondissement of Châteaubriant-Ancenis is an arrondissement of France in the Loire-Atlantique department in the Pays de la Loire region. It has 76 communes.

History

The arrondissement of Châteaubriant-Ancenis was created in January 2017 from the former arrondissements of Châteaubriant and Ancenis and 4 communes from the arrondissement of Nantes.

Composition

The communes of the arrondissement of Châteaubriant-Ancenis are:

 Abbaretz (44001)
 Ancenis-Saint-Géréon (44003)
 Avessac (44007)
 Blain (44015)
 Bouvron (44023)
 Casson (44027)
 Le Cellier (44028)
 La Chapelle-Glain (44031)
 Châteaubriant (44036)
 La Chevallerais (44221)
 Conquereuil (44044)
 Couffé (44048)
 Derval (44051)
 Erbray (44054)
 Fay-de-Bretagne (44056)
 Fégréac (44057)
 Fercé (44058)
 Le Gâvre (44062)
 Grand-Auverné (44065)
 Grandchamps-des-Fontaines (44066)
 La Grigonnais (44224)
 Guémené-Penfao (44067)
 Héric (44073)
 Issé (44075)
 Jans (44076)
 Joué-sur-Erdre (44077)
 Juigné-des-Moutiers (44078)
 Ligné (44082)
 Loireauxence (44213)
 Louisfert (44085)
 Lusanger (44086)
 Marsac-sur-Don (44091)
 Massérac (44092)
 La Meilleraye-de-Bretagne (44095)
 Mésanger (44096)
 Moisdon-la-Rivière (44099)
 Montrelais (44104)
 Mouais (44105)
 Mouzeil (44107)
 Nort-sur-Erdre (44110)
 Notre-Dame-des-Landes (44111)
 Noyal-sur-Brutz (44112)
 Nozay (44113)
 Oudon (44115)
 Pannecé (44118)
 Petit-Auverné (44121)
 Petit-Mars (44122)
 Pierric (44123)
 Le Pin (44124)
 Plessé (44128)
 Pouillé-les-Côteaux (44134)
 Puceul (44138)
 Riaillé (44144)
 La Roche-Blanche (44222)
 Rougé (44146)
 Ruffigné (44148)
 Saffré (44149)
 Saint-Aubin-des-Châteaux (44153)
 Saint-Julien-de-Vouvantes (44170)
 Saint-Mars-du-Désert (44179)
 Saint-Nicolas-de-Redon (44185)
 Saint-Vincent-des-Landes (44193)
 Sion-les-Mines (44197)
 Soudan (44199)
 Soulvache (44200)
 Sucé-sur-Erdre (44201)
 Teillé (44202)
 Les Touches (44205)
 Trans-sur-Erdre (44207)
 Treffieux (44208)
 Treillières (44209)
 Vair-sur-Loire (44163)
 Vallons-de-l'Erdre (44180)
 Vay (44214)
 Vigneux-de-Bretagne (44217)
 Villepot (44218)

List of sub-prefects

References

Sarrebourg-Chateau-Salins
States and territories established in 2017